Giuseppe Castelli (5 October 1907 – 19 December 1942) was an Italian athlete who competed mainly in the 100 metres.

Biography
He competed for Italy in the 1932 Summer Olympics held in Los Angeles, California, in the 4 x 100 metre relay where he won the bronze medal with his teammates Ruggero Maregatti, Gabriele Salviati and Edgardo Toetti. He was killed in action during World War II.

Olympic results

See also
 Italy national relay team

References

External links
 

1907 births
1942 deaths
Athletes (track and field) at the 1928 Summer Olympics
Athletes (track and field) at the 1932 Summer Olympics
Italian male sprinters
Olympic athletes of Italy
Olympic bronze medalists for Italy
Medalists at the 1932 Summer Olympics
Olympic bronze medalists in athletics (track and field)
Italian military personnel of World War II
Italian military personnel killed in World War II
People from Frugarolo
Sportspeople from the Province of Alessandria